The Communist Party of Bangladesh (Marxist–Leninist) is a Maoist political party in Bangladesh led by Badruddin Umar. Umar's BSD (ML) is an underground party and operates through its front Ganotantrik Biplobi Jote.

References 

Communist parties in Bangladesh
Maoist parties
Maoist organisations in Bangladesh